Akhtar Hussain (23 August 1926 – 9 November 1987) was a field hockey player, who won the gold medal at the 1948 Summer Olympics for India and the silver medal at the 1956 Summer Olympics for Pakistan. He is one of the first people in history to win Olympic medals for two distinct countries.

References

External links
 

1926 births
1987 deaths
Field hockey players from Bhopal
Indian emigrants to Pakistan
Muhajir people
Pakistani male field hockey players
Olympic field hockey players of India
Olympic field hockey players of Pakistan
Field hockey players at the 1948 Summer Olympics
Field hockey players at the 1956 Summer Olympics
Indian male field hockey players
Olympic gold medalists for India
Olympic silver medalists for Pakistan
Olympic medalists in field hockey
Medalists at the 1956 Summer Olympics
Medalists at the 1948 Summer Olympics